The 1953 San Francisco State Gators football team represented San Francisco State College—now known as San Francisco State University—as a member of the Far Western Conference (FWC) during the 1953 college football season. Led by fourth-year head coach Joe Verducci, San Francisco State compiled an overall record of 5–3 with a mark of 0–1 in conference play. For the season the team outscored its opponents 180 to 159. The Gators played home games at Cox Stadium in San Francisco.

Schedule

Team players in the NFL
No San Francisco State players were selected in the 1954 NFL Draft.

The following finished their college career in 1953, were not drafted, but played in the NFL.

Notes

References

San Francisco State
San Francisco State Gators football seasons
San Francisco State Gators football